Alain Jouffroy (11 September 1928 – 20 December 2015) was a French writer, poet and artist.

Jouffroy was born near Parc Montsouris, Paris. He was the first advocate of an Art Strike and formed the L'Union des Ecrivains during the strikes of May 1968 in France with Jean-Pierre Faye. He was also a great influence on the Zanzibar Group—part of the French new wave who took part in the Paris demonstrations at this time.

He won the Prix Goncourt for poetry in 2007.

Filmography

External links
 Portrait of Alain Jouffroy by Braun-Vega (1978).

References

Writers from Paris
1928 births
2015 deaths
20th-century French poets
French art critics
French male poets
Prix Goncourt de la Poésie winners
Prix Roger Caillois recipients
Prix Guillaume Apollinaire winners
Burials at Père Lachaise Cemetery
20th-century French male writers
French male non-fiction writers